Mali Bukovec is a village and municipality in Croatia in Varaždin County. According to the 2011 census, there are 2,212 inhabitants, absolute majority which are Croats.

References

Municipalities of Croatia
Populated places in Varaždin County